Edward Cresset (c. 1698 – 1755) was an 18th-century Anglican churchman.

Cresset was born in Glympton, Oxfordshire and educated at Trinity College, Oxford. He was successively Dean of Clogher; Dean of Hereford; and  Bishop of Llandaff.

Notes

Deans of Clogher
Deans of Hereford
Bishops of Llandaff
1755 deaths
Alumni of Trinity College, Oxford
People from Oxfordshire
18th-century Welsh Anglican bishops
Year of birth uncertain